Grapetree is a rural locality in the Toowoomba Region, Queensland, Australia. In the  Grapetree had a population of 32 people.

Geography 
The southern extent of Crows Nest National Park occupies the eastern half of Grapetree. Upper Cressbrook Creek forms part of the eastern boundary of Grapetree.  A small section of Pechey State Forest lies adjacent to the New England Highway which forms part of the western boundary.

History 
The locality was originally called Grape Tree, presumably after Grape Tree Creek which flows through the locality. The locality was officially named Grapetree in 2005. It was part of the Shire of Crows Nest until 2008 when the local government area was amalgamated into the Toowoomba Region.

In the  Grapetree had a population of 32 people.

References

Toowoomba Region
Localities in Queensland